Anthony John Abbott, CMG, OBE (born 9 September 1941) is a British diplomat, who served as Governor of Montserrat from 1997 to 2001.

Abbott was born in Ashton-under-Lyne, Lancashire in 1941 and joined the British diplomatic service in 1959. He was a vice consul in Iran and Finland in the 1960s, then returned to the UK where he was press officer for the Foreign and Commonwealth Office from 1969 to 1972. He then served as a passport officer in Zambia and a consul in Chile, then joined the secretariat of the President of the European Commission. In 1981 he was seconded to the British Overseas Trade Board, then in 1983 was HM Consul Lisbon until 1987.  From 1987 First Secretary and later Deputy High Commissioner at the British High Commission in Calcutta, India until 1991. In 1991, he was part of the EC Monitoring Missions in Croatia and Bosnia-Herzegovina.

After returning to the UK again, he was Deputy Head of Training Department in the FCO, then spent four years as consul-general in Perth, Western Australia. In 1997, he was sworn in as Governor of Montserrat, as which he served until 2001.. From June 2001 was Head of Pitcairn Islands Logistic Team based in Auckland, New Zealand until May 2004.

References

1941 births
Living people
British diplomats
Governors of Montserrat
Companions of the Order of St Michael and St George
Officers of the Order of the British Empire
Members of HM Diplomatic Service
20th-century British diplomats